"Onno Shomoy" is the debut album released by the Bangladeshi metal band Artcell in 2002 from G-Series. This album was highly appreciated by heavy metal listeners. This album helped to develop progressive metal music in Bangladesh. 

This album was dedicated to Rupok, who wrote many lyrics for Artcell. A song (রুপক: একটি গান) was also made in memory of Rupok in this album.

Track listing

Lyrics

"ভুল জন্ম" was written by Rupok. He also started "পথ চলা", but he died before completing it. It was later completed by Rumman Ahmed. Lincoln wrote the lyrics for "রাহুর গ্রাস" while "কৃত্রিম মানুষ" was written by Cézanne. "অবশ অনুভুতির দেয়াল" was written by Ershad. All the other songs were written by Rumman Ahmed.

Personnel

Band members 
 George Lincoln D'Costa – vocals, riff guitar
 Ershad Zaman – backing vocals, lead guitar
 Saef Al Nazi Cézanne – backing vocals, bass guitars
 Kazi Sazzadul Asheqeen Shaju – drums

Guest appearances 
 Iqbal Asif Jewel - keyboards on track 9
 Bassbaba Sumon - vocals on track 9

Productions 
 Iqbal Asif Jewel - CD Mastering
 Isha Khan Duray - Recorded, mixed and mastered cassette at Sound Garden Studio
 Rumman Ahmed - Album artwork
 Humayun Kabir - Album design

References

External links
 Onno Shomoy on YouTube
 
 Artcell Official Myspace

2002 debut albums
Artcell albums